South Melbourne Grammar School, was an independent, day and boarding school for boys, at Albert Road and Moray Street, South Melbourne. Founded in 1863 the school closed in 1878.

History
Scottish-born and Edinburgh-educated Robertt MacGregor (1825-1883) emigrated to Melbourne in the early 1850s. He resided in Emerald Hill and became headmaster of the South Melbourne Wesleyan day school. In 1863 he founded South Melbourne Grammar School which was the first secondary school in the area. Evening classes to prepare for matriculation, entry to the civil service, and commercial examinations were first offered in 1873. When McGregor was elected MLA for Fitzroy he closed the school.

Staff
 George Metcalfe (1839–1929) was Classics Master at the time he was appointed Headmaster of Newington College

Alumni
Frederick John Clendinnen (1860–1913) radiologist

References

Defunct schools in Victoria (Australia)
Educational institutions established in 1863
Educational institutions disestablished in 1877
1863 establishments in Australia
1877 disestablishments in Australia